Oxendolone, sold under the brand names Prostetin and Roxenone, is an antiandrogen and progestin medication which is used in Japan in the treatment of enlarged prostate. However, this use is controversial due to concerns about its clinical efficacy. Oxendolone is not effective by mouth and must be given by injection into muscle.

Oxendolone is an antiandrogen, and hence is an antagonist of the androgen receptor, the biological target of androgens like testosterone and dihydrotestosterone. It is also a progestin, or a synthetic progestogen, and hence is an agonist of the progesterone receptor, the biological target of progestogens like progesterone. Due to its progestogenic activity, oxendolone has antigonadotropic effects. Oxendolone has no other important hormonal activity...

Oxendolone was introduced for medical use in 1981. It is used only in Japan.

Medical uses
Oxendolone is used in the treatment of benign prostatic hyperplasia (BPH) in Japan. It has been used at a dosage of 200 mg once every 2 weeks via intramuscular injection. Although it is approved for the treatment of BPH in Japan, concerns have been raised about its use for this condition due to poor efficacy seen in clinical trials.

Side effects

Pharmacology

Pharmacodynamics
Oxendolone binds to the androgen receptor (Ki = 320 nM) and progesterone receptor (Ki = 20 nM) and acts as a weak but clinically relevant inhibitor of 5α-reductase ( = 1.4 μM). The relative binding affinity of oxendolone for the androgen receptor is 0.8 to 3.6% of that of metribolone. Oxendolone is not a silent antagonist of the androgen receptor but is rather predominantly antagonistic with weak agonistic activity; for this reason, it has been described as a selective androgen receptor modulator. The medication has potent antigonadotropic effects via its progestogenic activity. It has been found to suppress luteinizing hormone and testosterone levels to an equivalent extent as allylestrenol and chlormadinone acetate, which are two progestins that are similarly used at high doses to treat BPH.

Pharmacokinetics
The oral bioavailability of oxendolone in dogs is extremely low, 1% at most. Due to its low oral bioavailability, oxendolone is administered by intramuscular injection in humans. Its elimination half-life via this route is 5.0 to 6.6 days.

Chemistry

Oxendolone, also known as 16β-ethyl-19-nortestosterone or 16β-ethylestr-4-en-17β-ol-3-one, is a synthetic estrane steroid and a derivative of testosterone and 19-nortestosterone (nandrolone).

The acetate ester of oxendolone is known as TSAA-328, while the caproate ester of oxendolone is known as TSAA-330. They were never marketed.

History
Oxendolone has been marketed in Japan by Takeda since 1981.

Society and culture

Generic names
It is also known by its developmental code name TSAA-291.

Brand names
Oxendolone is or has been sold under the brand names Prostetin and Roxenone.

Availability
Oxendolone is marketed only in Japan.

References

5α-Reductase inhibitors
Secondary alcohols
Antigonadotropins
Drugs for benign prostatic hyperplasia
Estranes
Ketones
Progestogens
Steroidal antiandrogens